WSLW (1310 AM) is a broadcast radio station licensed to White Sulphur Springs, West Virginia, serving White Sulphur Springs and Lewisburg in West Virginia.  WSLW is owned by Todd P. Robinson.

Trivia
For a while, WSLW was licensed to the town of "White Sulphur Spring" in West Virginia, though there is no town by that spelling in West Virginia.  The correct spelling of the town's name is White Sulphur Springs.  This was finally corrected sometime in 2011.

Translator
In addition to the main station at 1310 kilohertz, two FM translators are used to provide nighttime coverage, albeit with a much smaller coverage area than the main AM station;

Previous logo

External links

SLW
White Sulphur Springs, West Virginia
Radio stations established in 1971
1971 establishments in West Virginia
SLW